An environmental ministry is a national or subnational government agency politically responsible for the environment and/or natural resources. Various other names are commonly used to identify such agencies, such as Ministry of the Environment, Department of the Environment,  Department for the Environment, Department of Environmental Protection, or Department of Natural Resources. Such agencies typically address environmental concerns such as the maintenance of environmental quality, nature preserves, the sustained use of natural resources, and prevention of pollution or contamination of the natural environment.

Following is a list of environmental ministries by country:

Algeria
 Ministry of Water Resources and Environment

Argentina
 Ministry of the Environment and Sustainable Development
 National Parks Administration

Australia

Federal
 Department of Agriculture, Water and the Environment 

States
 Department for Environment and Water (South Australia)
 Department of Environment and Science (Queensland)
 Department of Environment, Land, Water and Planning (Victoria)
 Department of Planning, Industry and Environment (New South Wales)
 Department of Primary Industries, Water and Environment (Tasmania)
 Department of Water and Environmental Regulation (Western Australia)

Azerbaijan
 Ministry of Ecology and Natural Resources

Brazil 
 Ministry of the Environment

Bulgaria 
 Ministry of Environment and Water

Cambodia 
 Ministry of Environment

Canada 
 National
 Environment and Climate Change Canada
 Fisheries and Oceans Canada
 Natural Resources Canada

 Provincial
 Department of Environment and Local Government (New Brunswick)
 Manitoba Environment, Climate and Parks
 Ministry of the Environment, Conservation and Parks
 Ministry of Natural Resources and Forestry
 Ministry of Energy and Natural Resources (Quebec)
 Ministry of Sustainable Development, Environment, and Fight Against Climate Change
 Nova Scotia Department of Environment and Climate Change

China, People's Republic of

Mainland China 
 Ministry of Ecology and Environment
 formerly Ministry of Environmental Protection (2008–2018)
 National Nuclear Safety Administration
 Ministry of Natural Resources
  (aka National Park Administration)

Hong Kong 
 Environment Bureau
 Environmental Protection Department
 Food and Health Bureau
 Agriculture, Fisheries and Conservation Department

Macau 
 Secretariat for Transport and Public Works

Croatia 
 Ministry of Construction and Spatial Planning
 Ministry of Environmental and Nature Protection

Cuba 
 Ministry of Science, Technology and Environment

Democratic Republic of the Congo 
 Ministry of Environment, Nature Conservation and Tourism

Denmark 
 Ministry of Climate and Energy
 Ministry of Environment
 Danish Forest and Nature Agency
 Danish Geodata Agency

Egypt 
 Ministry of Environment

Saudi Arabia 
Ministry of Environment Water and Agriculture (Saudi Arabia)

El Salvador 
 Ministry of the Environment and Natural Resources

Finland 
 Finnish Safety and Chemicals Agency
 Radiation and Nuclear Safety Authority

France 
 Ministry of Agriculture, Food, Fisheries, Rural Affairs and Spatial Planning
 Ministry of Ecology, Sustainable Development and Energy

Georgia 

 Ministry of Environmental Protection and Agriculture

Germany 
 Federal Ministry for Environment, Nature Conservation and Nuclear Safety (BMU) with:
 Umweltbundesamt (UBA) — the German Environment Agency, which provides scientific support
 Federal Agency for Nature Conservation
 Bundesamt für kerntechnische Entsorgungssicherheit - the German agency for nuclear safety
 Bundesamt für Strahlenschutz

 Federal Ministry for Food and Agriculture (BMEL) with:
 Agency for Renewable Resources
 Federal Institute for Risk Assessment 
 etc.

Greece 
 Ministry of the Environment, Energy and Climate Change

Guatemala 
 Ministry of the Environment and Natural Resources

Honduras 
 Secretariat of Energy, Natural Resources, Environment and Mines

Iceland
 Ministry for the Environment and Natural Resources

India
 Ministry of Environment, Forest and Climate Change
 Central Pollution Control Board
 Indian Council of Forestry Research and Education
 Indian Forest Service

Indonesia 
 Ministry of Environment and Forestry
 Directorate General of Nature Resources and Ecosystem Conservation

Iran 
 Department of Environment

Ireland 
 Department of Agriculture, Food and the Marine
 Department of the Environment, Climate and Communications
 Environmental Protection Agency

Israel
 Environmental Protection Ministry

Italy
 Ministry of the Environment (Italy)

Japan
 Ministry of the Environment

Korea, Republic of (South Korea) 
 Ministry of Environment

Kuwait
 Environment Public Authority

Lithuania 

 Ministry of Environment

Luxembourg
 Department of Environment

Malaysia
 Ministry of Natural Resources, Environment and Climate Change

Mexico 
 Secretariat of Environment and Natural Resources
 National Forestry Commission of Mexico

Myanmar
 Ministry of Environmental Conservation and Forestry

Netherlands
 Ministry of Infrastructure and Water Management

New Zealand
 Department of Conservation
 Ministry for the Environment
 Ministry for Primary Industries

Nicaragua
 Ministry of the Environment and Natural Resources

Nigeria 
 National
 Federal Ministry of Agriculture and Rural Development
 Federal Ministry of Environment

 States
 Rivers State Ministry of Environment

Norway 
 Ministry of Agriculture and Food
 Ministry of the Environment
 Climate and Pollution Agency
 Directorate for Nature Management

Pakistan
 Ministry of Environment

Papua New Guinea
 Papua New Guinea Conservation & Environment Protection Authority

Peru

 Ministry of Environment

Philippines
 Department of Environment and Natural Resources
Environmental Management Bureau
Mines and Geosciences Bureau
Land Management Bureau
Forest Management Bureau
Ecosystem Research Development Bureau

Poland
 Ministry of Environment

Portugal 
Ministry of Environment

Romania
 Ministry of Environment and Forests

Russia
 Ministry of Agriculture
  Federal Service for Veterinary and Phytosanitary Supervision
  Federal Agency for Fishery
 Ministry of Natural Resources and Environment
 Federal Service for Hydrometeorology and Environmental Monitoring
 Federal Service for Supervision of Natural Resources
 Federal Agency of Water Resources
 Federal Agency for Forestry
 Federal Agency for Mineral Resources

Singapore

 Ministry of Sustainability and the Environment
 National Environment Agency
 National Parks Board

South Africa 
 Department of Agriculture, Land Reform & Rural Development
 Department of Environment, Forestry & Fisheries

South Korea 
 Ministry for Food, Agriculture, Forestry and Fisheries
 Ministry of Environment

Spain
 Ministry for the Ecological Transition and the Demographic Challenge
 Ministry of Agriculture, Fisheries and Food

Sri Lanka 
 Ministry of Agrarian Services and Wildlife
  Department of Wildlife Conservation
 Ministry of Mahaweli Development and Environment
 Department of Forest Conservation

Sweden
 Ministry of the Environment
 Environmental Protection Agency
 Swedish Chemicals Agency

Switzerland
 Federal Department of Environment, Transport, Energy and Communications

Republic of China (Taiwan) 
 Environmental Protection Administration, Executive Yuan

Tanzania
 Ministry of Natural Resources and Tourism

Thailand 
 Ministry of Natural Resources and Environment (Thailand)

Turkey
 Ministry of Energy and Natural Resources
 Ministry of Environment and Urbanisation
 Ministry of Forest and Water Management

Ukraine
 Ministry of Ecology

United Kingdom
 Department for Environment, Food and Rural Affairs (DEFRA)

England
 Environment Agency (protection and regulation)
 Forestry Commission
Historic England (monuments and buildings)
Natural England (conservation)

Northern Ireland
 Department of Agriculture, Environment and Rural Affairs
 Northern Ireland Environment Agency (protection, conservation, and monuments and buildings)
 Department of the Environment (Northern Ireland), dissolved 2016

Scotland
 Historic Environment Scotland (monuments and buildings)
 Scottish Environment Protection Agency (protection and regulation)
 Scottish Natural Heritage (conservation)

Wales
 Cadw (monuments and buildings)
 Natural Resources Wales (environmental protection and conservation)

United States
 National
 Council on Environmental Quality
 United States Department of Agriculture
 United States Forest Service
 United States Department of Defense
 United States Department of Energy
 United States Department of the Interior
 Bureau of Land Management
 National Park Service
 United States Fish and Wildlife Service
 United States Geological Survey
 United States Environmental Protection Agency

 State

 Territory
 Puerto Rico Department of Natural and Environmental Resources

Uruguay
 Ministry of Environment

Venezuela
 Ministry of Environment and Natural Resources

See also 

 Environment minister
 List of agriculture ministries
 List of environmental organizations
 List of forestry ministries
 List of ministers of the environment
 List of ministers of climate change

References 

Environmental
Environmental